Perry Johanson (9 May 1910 in Greeley, Colorado – 15 June 1981 in Seattle) was a Seattle architect and one of the founders of the architectural firm NBBJ.

Johanson enrolled in the architecture program at the University of Washington in 1929 and graduated in 1934 with a B.Arch.  While in school he was particularly influenced by Lionel Pries.

Johanson was initially employed by the Seattle firm Smith & Carroll, but within two years he was a partner in the firm, renamed Smith, Carroll & Johanson; the firm survived until 1951.

In 1943, during World War II, he joined with Floyd Naramore, William J. Bain, and Clifton Brady to form Naramore, Bain, Brady & Johanson (informally known as "The Combine" at the time) to undertake war-related projects such as reinforcing architecture.  This joint venture worked so well that the partners continued it after 1945.  Johanson remained a partner until his death.  Today's NBBJ is the successor firm.

Johanson was one of the architects who joined together about 1950 to create the Hilltop community in Bellevue, Washington, a planned residential community of modern homes on large lots.  
 
In 1950-51, Johanson served as the president of the Washington State AIA Chapter (predecessor to today's AIA Seattle Chapter).  He was named a fellow of the AIA in 1960.

He married sculptor Jean Johanson in 1936. The couple had two children.

References

 Ochsner, Jeffrey Karl, ed., Shaping Seattle Architecture:  A Historical Guide to the Architects, Seattle and London: University of Washington Press, 1994, page 346;  
 "Have We an Indigenous Northwest Architecture? Symposium." Architectural Record, 113 (April 1953), pp. 140–146.
 "Houses for Defense at Bremerton, Wash; Private Architects Prove that a Government Project Can Be Attractive at Low Cost and without Sacrifice of Speed." Architectural Forum, 75 (December 1941), pp. 409–415.
 "New Fellows of the AIA," Journal of the American Institute of Architects, 33 (June 1960), p. 52.
 Obituary, AIA Journal, 70 (September 1981), p. 91.
 Portrait, Architectural Forum, 95 (September 1951), p. 132.
 Portrait, Progressive Architecture, 28 (November 1947), p. 12.
 Portrait, Progressive Architecture, 29 (December 1948), p. 50.
 Portrait, Progressive Architecture, 31 (September 1950), p. 57.
 Portrait, Architectural Forum, 89 (July 1948), p. 20.

1910 births
1981 deaths
Architects from Colorado
Fellows of the American Institute of Architects
Architects from Seattle
University of Washington College of Built Environments alumni
20th-century American architects